Al Mahabishah District is a district of the Hajjah Governorate, Yemen. As of 2003, the district had a population of 50,865 inhabitants.

References

Districts of Hajjah Governorate